The Renfe Class 730 or S-730<ref>From Serie 730 de Renfe</ref> (Spanish: Serie 730 de Renfe, manufacturer's designation Talgo 250 Dual) is a high-speed dual-gauge, dual-voltage and hybrid (electric and diesel) trainset consisting of 11 Talgo VII tilting coaches and two power cars, used on Alvia services.Trayectos y Servicios - clase turista Renfe.es The class have been nicknamed patitos (ducklings/little ducks), due to the shape of the train nose. They are a variant of RENFE Class 130 modified to be able to run on both electric and diesel power, in order to extend higher-quality services to parts of Spain not on the electrified network.

Background and design
The trainsets are designed for high-speed services on conventional Iberian gauge network and standard-gauge high-speed lines; they can change gauge at low speed without stopping using Talgo's RD variable gauge system. The carriages are constructed from aluminium and incorporate the Talgo Pendular passive pendulum tilting system, are sealed against pressure differences for tunnel travel, and have underframe air conditioning, individual audio systems and video displays, rotating and reclining seats and power outlets.

Capacity in standard class is 36 seated, in first class 26 seats, end coaches have lower capacity, one coach is typically used for restaurant/sales services.

The power cars use AC traction motors controlled by IGBT inverters which include integrated auxiliary inverters. Signalling systems can include ETCS Level 2, LZB, ASFA and Ebicab900TBS.

2013 Santiago de Compostela accident

On 24 July 2013 a Renfe Class S730 running as the Alvia 4155 service from Madrid to Ferrol derailed and crashed near Santiago de Compostela in north-western Spain, killing 78, out of 218 passengers on board. The cause of the accident is not yet officially determined, but the train was alleged to be traveling over twice the posted speed limit while entering a curve, due to the absence of ERTMS.

 See also 
 Renfe Class 130
 List of high-speed trains
 Stamps with Renfe Class 730

References

Other sources
Information on the crash absorption and coupling module of the S130 powerheads Esytech.deExternal links

Renfe Serie 130 Information from Ferropedia.es''

Alvia high-speed trains
Electric multiple units with locomotive-like power cars
Diesel multiple units with locomotive-like power cars
Passenger trains running at least at 250 km/h in commercial operations